Mory-Fallo Keïta (born 13 December 1992) is a Guinean footballer who plays as a forward for Guinée Championnat National club Ashanti Golden Boys.

Club career

Youth career
Mory began his footballing career at the age of 12 with his hometown, Conakry-based local side, FC Boly Coleyah. In 2005, he began playing for another local side, Elephants de Coleyah. He signed a one-year contract in 2006 with Baraka Djoma SSG and represented the Conakry-based side at various levels. He first moved out of Guinea in 2007 to Belgium where he began plying his trade with the junior sides of Belgian giants, Sporting Charleroi

Charleroi
Impressed with his brilliant display for the junior sides of the Charleroi-based side, the club management decide to promote the player to the senior side in 2007. He made his debut for the senior side on 3 February 2011 in a 2–0 win over Beerschot AC. He made 4 appearances in the 2010–11 Belgian Pro League.

Virton
He moved on loan to Belgian Division 3 side, Virton in 2011. He made his Belgian Second Amateur Division debut and scored his first goal in the competition on 24 August 2011 in a 1–0 win over Royal Football Club Huy. He scored 10 goals in 16 appearances in the 2011–12 Belgian Division 3 season before completing his one-year loan period at the Huy-based club.

Olympic de Charleroi
He moved back Charleroi in 2013 where he signed a one-year contract with Belgian Division 3 side, Olympic Charleroi. He scored 18 goals in 28 appearances in the 2013–14 Belgian Division 3. He was highly praised for his performances as he had earned his form back after a long unsuccessful period of time and a number of injuries.

Wiltz 71
He moved out of Belgium in 2015 after a five-year long spell to Luxembourg where he signed a one-year contract with Wiltz-based side, FC Wiltz 71. He made his Luxembourg National Division on 2 August 2015 in a 6–0 loss against F91 Dudelange and scored his first goal in the competition on 27 September 2015 in a 1–0 win over FC UNA Strassen He scored 5 goals in 20 appearances in the 2015–16 Luxembourg National Division.

Return to Wiltz 71
A few hours before the closing of the summer transfermarket, Keïta re-joined FC Wiltz 71 after a short period at Belgian club Patro Eisden Maasmechelen. He played 14 games and scored 6 goals before he left at the end of 2018.

Al Akhdar
In the winter 2018–19, it was reported that Keïta had signed with Al Akhdar SC in Libya. He confirmed in an interview in February 2019, that the club had invited him, paid for everything and he had signed a six-months contract with an option for one further year. However, he also announced in the interview, that he was waiting for his work visa.

Kawkab Marrakech
On 25 July 2019 it was confirmed, that Keïta had joined Moroccan club Kawkab Marrakech.

Ashanti Golden Boys
In 2020, Keïta returned to Guinea where he signed with Guinée Championnat National club Ashanti Golden Boys.

References

External links
Mory-Fallo Keïta at Goal.com
foot224.net
acturcsc.skynetblogs.be

Mechac Koffi - YouTube
Mechac Koffi - YouTube
Mechac Koffi - YouTube
Mechac Koffi - YouTube
Mechac Koffi-YouTube
youtube.com

1992 births
Living people
Sportspeople from Conakry
Guinean footballers
Guinean expatriate footballers
Association football forwards
R. Charleroi S.C. players
R.E. Virton players
R. Olympic Charleroi Châtelet Farciennes players
FC Wiltz 71 players
UR La Louvière Centre players
Atlanta Silverbacks players
K. Patro Eisden Maasmechelen players
Kawkab Marrakech players
Belgian Pro League players
Luxembourg National Division players
Expatriate footballers in Belgium
Expatriate footballers in Luxembourg
Expatriate soccer players in the United States
Expatriate footballers in Libya
Expatriate footballers in Morocco
Guinean expatriate sportspeople in Belgium
Guinean expatriate sportspeople in Luxembourg
Guinean expatriate sportspeople in Morocco
AS Ashanti Golden Boys players